Charles W. Bidwill (September 16, 1895 – April 19, 1947), sometimes known as Charley Bidwill, was an owner of the National Football League's Chicago Cardinals. He owned the team for 14 seasons, from 1933 through 1946. Bidwell was inducted into the Pro Football Hall of Fame in 1967.

Early years
Bidwill was the son of Chicago 9th Ward Alderman Joseph Edward Bidwill and Mary Anne Sullivan. His eldest brother Joseph Edward Bidwill Jr. was a clerk of the Chicago Circuit Court and his younger brother Arthur John Bidwill was a Republican State Senator; he also had a sister, Loretta Josephine Bidwill.

Before the Cardinals
Prior to his ownership of the Cardinals, Bidwill was a successful businessman and wealthy lawyer in Chicago, with ties to organized crime boss Al Capone. He was owner of a racing stable, the president of the Chicago Stadium Operating Company and owner of a printing company. Bidwill's only physical participation in athletics came only during his time at St. Ignatius High School and Loyola University. After graduation in 1916, he began his law practice, serving as assistant prosecutor for Chicago and corporation counsel. As a businessman, Bidwill was often referred to as "Blue Shirt Charlie" because he sometimes favored a blue shirt and high boots instead of the traditional white shirt and businessman's shoes.

Bidwill was part owner of the Chicago Bears, after he helped George Halas buy Edward "Dutch" Sternaman's share of the team in 1933. According to Halas, Bidwill purchased team stocks for $5,000:

Cardinals

Purchase
One night in 1932, Dr. David Jones, the then-owner of the Cardinals, and his wife were guests at an informal dinner party aboard Bidwill's luxurious power-cruising yacht, The Ren-Mar. Bidwill, then a vice president of the Chicago Bears, spoke with Jones that night and the conversation turned to pro football, with Jones complaining of the poor state of his team. Half-jokingly, Bidwill's wife, Violet, asked Jones, "Why don't you sell the Cardinals to Charley?" Jones replied that he would sell anything he owned if the price was right. Bidwill soon turned to Jones and the two began to discuss an offer. Bidwill went on to buy the Cardinals from Jones for $50,000. Bidwill handed Jones a down payment of $2,000 and the two men shook hands. The sale was not announced until 1933 to allow Bidwill time to dispose of his stock in the Bears. It was well known that Bidwill would have much preferred to buy the Bears, but George Halas refused to sell.

As the owner
In 1940 he tried but failed to buy the Detroit Lions. He then hired Jimmy Conzelman as coach, who later quit as coach to work for the St. Louis Browns.

World War II years

In 1944, due to World War II, many players were serving in the United States military, leaving a league-wide shortage of players. As a result, the Cardinals and the Pittsburgh Steelers merged their teams for the season. The team's name Card-Pitt was quickly dubbed the "Carpets" by detractors, as "every team in the league walks over them". The team lost ten straight to post an 0–10 record.

The AAFC
After the war the AAFC placed a team in Chicago, the Rockets, which publicly pushed for the Cardinals to leave town. In   1947 Bidwill outbid the Rockets for the rights to All-American Charley Trippi, signing him to a then record $100,000 contract. Trippi was the final piece of what Bidwill called his "Dream Backfield" of Paul Christman, Pat Harder, Marshall Goldberg, Elmer Angsman, and Trippi. They led the Cardinals to their first (and, to date, only) undisputed NFL championship in 1947.

Death and legacy
He died of pneumonia in April 1947, shortly after signing Trippi. His widow Violet inherited the team and operated it until her death in early 1962. During her tenure as the Cardinals owner, she and her husband Walter Wolfner relocated the franchise to St. Louis in 1960. Following her death, she left the team to her adopted sons from her first marriage,  Charles Jr. and Bill. He is a member of the Chicagoland Sports Hall of Fame and was inducted into the Pro Football Hall of Fame in 1967.

Bill Bidwill bought his elder brother's share in 1972. During Bill's time as owner, the team relocated once more, to Phoenix, Arizona, in 1988, and since 1994 have been known as the Arizona Cardinals. He remained sole owner until his death in 2019. His son Michael Bidwill, who had been team president and operating head of the franchise since 2007, inherited the team. Only the Bears (owned by Halas and his descendants since 1921) and the New York Giants (owned by the Mara family since their founding in 1925) have been in the hands of one family longer than the Cardinals.

References

External links
 
 

1895 births
1947 deaths
Deaths from pneumonia in the United States
Chicago Cardinals owners
Pro Football Hall of Fame inductees
St. Ignatius College Prep alumni
Businesspeople from Chicago
Illinois lawyers
Bidwill family